Judah and Judas are masculine given names derived from the Hebrew name, Yehuda(h), of the biblical figure Judah (son of Jacob). Notable people with one or the other variant of the name include:

Biblical and ancient historical figures
In chronological order:
 Judah (son of Jacob), fourth son of the Biblical patriarch Jacob 
 Judah Maccabee or Judas Maccabeus, Jewish priest who led the Maccabean Revolt against the Seleucid Empire (167–160 BCE)
 Judas Iscariot, Hebrew Yehūḏā ʾĪš-Qǝrīyyōṯ, 'Judah, man of Kerioth' (died c. AD 30), one of the original Twelve Apostles of Jesus
 Judah ha-Nasi, also Judah the Prince or Judah I, Jewish sage and leader (2nd century)
 Judah II, Jewish sage (3rd century)
 Judah III, Jewish sage (3rd and 4th century)
 Judah IV, Talmudic sage (4th century)
 Judah b. Meremar, Babylonian sage (5th century?)

People with the given name

Judah
In alphabetical order:
 Judah P. Benjamin (1811–1884), politician and lawyer in the United States and Confederate States of America
 Judah Bergman aka "Jack Kid Berg" (1909–1991), English world champion Hall of Fame junior welterweight boxer
 Judah Loew ben Bezalel (1512-1526 – 1609) or Rabbi Loew of Prague, the Maharal, Talmudic scholar, Jewish mystic and philosopher
 Judah David Bleich (born 1936), American rabbi and authority on Jewish law and ethics
 Judah Folkman (1933–2008), American cellular biologist, founder of the field of antiangiogenesis
 Judah Friedlander (born 1969), American actor best known from 30 Rock
 Judah Grace (born 2022), American person known for being born on twosday at 2:22 AM.
 Judah Halevi (1075–1141), medieval Spanish Jewish philosopher and poet
 Judah Hertz (born 1948/49), American real estate investor
 Judah Lewis (born 2000 or 2001), American actor
 Judah Leon Magnes (1877–1948), rabbi, first President of the Hebrew University of Jerusalem
 Judah Nagler (born 1980), singer, guitarist, and songwriter for indie-pop band The Velvet Teen
 "Judah son of Jesus", name on one of the ossuaries in the 1st-century Talpiot Tomb

Yehuda(h), Yehudi
In alphabetical order of their surname:
 Yehuda Alharizi (mid-12th century – 1225), medieval Spanish rabbi, translator, poet and traveller
 Yehuda Amichai (1924–2000), Israeli poet
 Yehuda Amital (1924–2010), dean of Yeshivat Har Etzion, former Israeli cabinet member
 Yehuda Atedji (born 1961), Israeli Olympic windsurfer
 Yehuda Danon (born 1940), Israeli doctor
 Yehuda Gilad (musician), contemporary clarinetist and conductor
 Yehuda Gilad (politician) (born 1955), Israeli rabbi and politician
 Yehudah Glick (born 1965), American-born Israeli Orthodox rabbi, activist, and politician
 Yehuda Green (born 1959), Shlomo Carlebach-inspired Hasidic singer, composer, and hazzan
 Yehuda Hayuth (born 1946), Israeli professor of geography
 Yehudah Jacobs (c. 1940–2020), American rabbi
 Yehuda Krinsky (born 1933), Chabad Lubavitch Hasidic rabbi
 Yehuda Kurtzer (born 1977), President of The Shalom Hartman Institute of North America
 Yehuda Moraly (born 1948), Israeli theater researcher, playwright, director, actor, and professor
 Yehuda Poliker (born 1950), Israeli singer-songwriter
 Yehudi Menuhin (1916–1999), world-famous violinist
 Yehuda Tzadka (1910–1991), dean of Porat Yosef Yeshiva, Jerusalem
 Yehuda Wiener-Gafni (born 1930), Israeli Olympic basketball player
 Yehuda Weisenstein (born 1955), Israeli Olympic fencer
 Yehuda Zadok (born 1958), Israeli Olympic runner

Fictional characters
 Judah Ben-Hur, main character of the 1880 Lew Wallace novel Ben-Hur: A Tale of the Christ and film adaptations

See also

Judah (disambiguation)
Judas (disambiguation)

Jewish masculine given names